Janeece "Jan" Adele (14 April 1935 – 27 February 2000) was an Australian actress and entertainer active in many fields including circus, vaudeville, theatre, film and television. She was best known for her recurring comedy role of vaudevillian showgirl Trixie O'Toole in the 1970s television soap opera Number 96. usually sharing scenes with co-stars Wendy Blacklock and Mike Dorsey.

Career

Early career

Adele, is a fourth generation performer, her grandfather surname Roy Kelroy had worked for Barnum and Bailey circus in America. She appeared in pantomime from the age of three at Mark Foy's, her aunt Eilleen Pascoe Webb. ran an elocution and dance school in Melbourne, her mother known professionally as Eris O'Dell worked at the Tivoli and J.C. Williamson, a singer, actress and dancer and also played piano, and was an assistant producer to Jack Davey at the Macquarie theatre radio and to Wallace Parnell, at the Tivoli, Adele did not known her father. Adele had 2 children. Jan enjoyed a long and varied entertainment career. As a teenager she  performed in the circus as an acrobat on the high wire, and as a contortionist. At the age of 19 she began a three-year stint entertaining US troops in Korea and Japan. In 1971 she was part of the New South Wales Concert Party, entertaining Australian troops in Vietnam. After this she performed steadily in vaudeville theatre and as a show girl.

Television
In the 1970s she moved into television with guest spots in the Crawford Productions police dramas Homicide and Division 4. Subsequent to this she was spotted by Number 96 producer Bill Harmon in a pantomime show and he devised the character of Trixie – a warm and funny stage and nightclub entertainer who has been treading the boards for years – for her.

Some of the humour of her Number 96 character was built around Adele's 15 stone figure. When joining the series Adele happily signed the nudity clause present in all cast member's contracts reasoning that she would never be called upon to strip. She was later horrified to learn she would need to appear semi nude for a comedy sequence in the show, however went ahead with the scenes. In the late 1970s she also was frequent comedy performer on The Mike Walsh Show.

Adele was a frequent guest on Good Morning Australia with Bert Newton. Later television guest appearances included Bony (1992), Heartbreak High (1994), Home and Away and 42nd Street.

Film
Adele subsequently acted in several Australian films. These included High Tide (1987), for which she won a Best Actress Award from the Australian Film Institute, Daisy and Simon (1988), ...Almost (1990), Greenkeeping (1992), Fatal Bond (1992) and The Sum of Us (1994).

Personal life
She was married at 17. Her second husband, actor Rick Marshall,  was a bisexual. Her third marriage was to musician David Anderson in 1962. Adele had two daughters, Mandy and Jody.

Awards

Mo Awards
The Australian Entertainment Mo Awards (commonly known informally as the Mo Awards), were annual Australian entertainment industry awards. They recognise achievements in live entertainment in Australia from 1975 to 2016. Jan Adele won two awards in that time, and the encouragement award was named named him.
 (wins only)
|-
| 1977
| Jan Adele
| Comedian / Comedianne of the Year 
| 
|-
| 1982
| Jan Adele and Lucky Grills – Fun Follies
| Variety Show of the Year 
| 
|-

References

External links

Australian stage actresses
Australian television actresses
1935 births
2000 deaths
20th-century Australian actresses
Best Supporting Actress AACTA Award winners
21st-century Australian women
21st-century Australian people